Aalatettix longipulvillus is a species of pygmy grasshopper in the family Tetrigidae. It is found in China.

References

Tetrigidae
Insects described in 2002